The 1888 United States presidential election in Nebraska took place on November 6, 1888, as part of the 1888 United States presidential election. Voters chose five representatives, or electors to the Electoral College, who voted for president and vice president.

Nebraska voted for the Republican nominee, Benjamin Harrison, over the Democratic nominee, incumbent President Grover Cleveland. Harrison won the state by a margin of 13.76%.

Results

Results by county

See also
 United States presidential elections in Nebraska

References

Nebraska
1888
1888 Nebraska elections